Teatr Demona (lit. Demon's Theatre) is the tenth studio album by Russian punk-rock band "Korol i Shut", released in 2010. It was their last album featuring the band's long-time main lyric writer, second vocalist and founding member Andrei Knyazev, who left the band in 2011. The entire album was recorded with acoustic instruments only, in the unusual (for the band) genre of art punk.

Track listing

Songwriters:
Music by M. Gorsheniov (1, 2, 4, 5, 7, 9, 10, 12) and A. Knyazev (3, 6, 8, 11).
Lyrics by A. Knyazev (1 — 9, 11) and M. Gorsheniov (7, 10, 12).

References
Album on the Official site

2010 albums
Korol i Shut albums